Elizabeth Harvest is a 2018 science-fiction thriller film that was written and directed by Sebastian Gutierrez. The film premiered at South by Southwest on March 10, 2018, and stars Abbey Lee as the titular Elizabeth, a young woman who discovers that her new husband is hiding secrets.

Plot
Elizabeth, a new bride, is brought home on her wedding day by her husband Dr Henry Kellenberg. Henry’s house is palatial and only two other people live there; the housekeeper Claire, and Henry’s adult son Oliver (who is blind). Henry shows Elizabeth around the house, telling her that she can enter any room except one, which is located in the basement.

After Henry leaves for work each day, Elizabeth is left to her own devices. Initially, her new clothing and jewellery, and the various luxuries provided by her new home are sufficient to entertain her. But eventually her curiosity gets the better of her and she explores the forbidden room, where she discovers clones of herself. She runs out of the room in a panic, leaving the door open. When Henry returns, he quickly discovers her deceit and brutually murders Elizabeth. Claire and Oliver help him to dispose of her corpse in a shallow grave in the grounds.

Six weeks later, another “Elizabeth” is traveling home with Henry after their wedding, exactly as before. The new Elizabeth goes through the same experiences, also discovering the room with the clones, except she manages to kill Henry before he can kill her. When Oliver and Claire find out what has happened and that Henry is dead, Claire has a heart attack and is taken to the hospital.

Oliver imprisons Elizabeth and asks her to read Claire's journal to him; he tells her that he will not release her until she does. The journal reveals that the real Elizabeth was Henry's wife, but she died of a rare medical condition. Unable to bear her loss, Henry decided to create clones of Elizabeth, and hired Claire (a biologist) to help him to perfect the clones. The initial attempts were abortive, but eventually they succeeded. From the journal, it is learned that Henry and Claire have awoken six clones in total, including the current “Elizabeth” who is the "Fifth Elizabeth". The journal also reveals Claire’s suspicions that Oliver is actually a clone of Henry, the revelation of which she confronted Henry with and he did not deny.

When Elizabeth tells Oliver this, he states that Henry blinded him out of jealousy as a child, not liking Oliver's growing friendship with one of the child clones and after Oliver had confronted Henry of molesting one of them.  Elizabeth attacks Oliver and tries to escape, but suddenly a new (6th and final) “Elizabeth” clone appears, holding a rifle. Confused and disoriented, the new clone shoots and kills Oliver. Elizabeth is also fatally wounded by the new clone, but before she dies she tells the clone to read Claire’s journal.

The new (and final) Elizabeth reads the journal which tells how Henry and Claire initially met, and details their work together on the cloning experiments. They had a brief intimate relationship at this time, but later Claire discovered that Henry simply wished to relive his wedding night with each new cloned Elizabeth, prior to murdering them. This horrified Claire.

Recovered from her heart attack, Claire returns to the house from the hospital. The latest Elizabeth clone gives her the journal, and tells Claire to put her research to better use.  Then the new Elizabeth leaves to start life on her own.

Cast
Abbey Lee as Elizabeth
Matthew Beard as Oliver
Carla Gugino as Claire
Ciarán Hinds as Henry
Dylan Baker as Logan

Reception
Multiple reviewers compared the film's storyline to the folk tale "Bluebeard", with Variety praising the performances of Gugino and Lee. Reviewing for RogerEbert.com, Sheila O'Malley gave the movie two stars, criticizing the movie for its slow pace.

References

External links
 

2018 films
2010s science fiction thriller films
Films set in the United States
Films shot in Colombia
American science fiction thriller films
Films directed by Sebastian Gutierrez
2010s English-language films
2010s American films